Kahupake Rongonui ( 1868/1869 – 17 January 1947) was a notable New Zealand tribal leader. Of Māori descent, she identified with the Te Ākitai Waiohua iwi. She was born in Auckland, New Zealand in about 1868.

References

1868 births
1947 deaths
People from Auckland
Te Ākitai Waiohua people